Moral foundations theory is a social psychological theory intended to explain the origins of and variation in human moral reasoning on the basis of innate, modular foundations. It was first proposed by the psychologists Jonathan Haidt, Craig Joseph, and Jesse Graham, building on the work of cultural anthropologist Richard Shweder. It has been subsequently developed by a diverse group of collaborators and popularized in Haidt's book The Righteous Mind. The theory proposes six foundations: Care/Harm, Fairness/Cheating, Loyalty/Betrayal, Authority/Subversion, Sanctity/Degradation, and Liberty/Oppression. Its authors remain open to the addition, subtraction, or modification of the set of foundations.

Although the initial development of moral foundations theory focused on cultural differences, subsequent work with the theory has largely focused on political ideology. Various scholars have offered moral foundations theory as an explanation of differences among political progressives (liberals in the American sense), conservatives, and right-libertarians (libertarians in the American sense), and have suggested that it can explain variation in opinion on politically charged issues such as same sex marriage and abortion.

The two main sources are The Pragmatic Validity of Moral Pluralism and Mapping the Moral Domain. In the first Haidt and Graham describe their work as looking, as anthropologists, at the evolution of morality and finding the common ground between each variation. In the second they describe and defend their method, known as the Moral Foundations Questionnaire. Through studies that jointly consisted of over 11,000 people, from a variety of ages and political beliefs, they found results that supported their prediction.

Origins
Moral foundations theory was first proposed in 2004 by Haidt and Joseph. The theory emerged as a reaction against the developmental rationalist theory of morality associated with Lawrence Kohlberg and Jean Piaget. Building on Piaget's work, Kohlberg argued that children's moral reasoning changed over time, and proposed an explanation through his six stages of moral development. Kohlberg's work emphasized justice as the key concept in moral reasoning, seen as a primarily cognitive activity, and became the dominant approach to moral psychology, heavily influencing subsequent work. Haidt writes that he found Kohlberg's theories unsatisfying from the time he first encountered them in graduate school because they "seemed too cerebral" and lacked a focus on issues of emotion.

In contrast to the dominant theories of morality in psychology, the anthropologist Richard Shweder developed a set of theories emphasizing the cultural variability of moral judgments, but argued that different cultural forms of morality drew on "three distinct but coherent clusters of moral concerns", which he labeled as the ethics of autonomy, community, and divinity. Shweder's approach inspired Haidt to begin researching moral differences across cultures, including fieldwork in Brazil and Philadelphia. This work led Haidt to begin developing his social intuitionist approach to morality. This approach, which stood in sharp contrast to Kohlberg's rationalist work, suggested that "moral judgment is caused by quick moral intuitions" while moral reasoning simply serves as a post-hoc rationalization of already formed judgments. Haidt's work and his focus on quick, intuitive, emotional judgments quickly became very influential, attracting sustained attention from an array of researchers.

As Haidt and his collaborators worked within the social intuitionist approach, they began to devote attention to the sources of the intuitions that they believed underlay moral judgments. In a 2004 article published in the journal Daedalus, Haidt and Joseph surveyed works on the roots of morality, including the work of Frans de Waal, Donald Brown and Shweder, as well as Alan Fiske's relational models theory and Shalom Schwartz's Theory of Basic Human Values. From their review of these earlier lines of research, they suggested that all individuals possess four "intuitive ethics", stemming from the process of human evolution as responses to adaptive challenges. They labelled these four ethics as suffering, hierarchy, reciprocity, and purity.

Invoking the notion of preparedness, Haidt and Joseph claimed that each of the ethics formed a cognitive module, whose development was shaped by culture.  They wrote that each module could "provide little more than flashes of affect when certain patterns are encountered in the social world", while a cultural learning process shaped each individual's response to these flashes. Morality diverges because different cultures utilize the four "building blocks" provided by the modules differently. Their Daedalus article became the first statement of moral foundations theory, which Haidt, Graham, Joseph, and others have since elaborated and refined, for example by splitting the originally proposed ethic of hierarchy into the separate moral foundations of ingroup and authority, and by proposing a tentative sixth foundation of liberty.

The foundations

The main five foundations
According to Moral Foundations Theory, differences in people's moral concerns can be described in terms of five moral foundations:
Individualizing cluster of Care and Fairness, and the group-focused Binding cluster of Loyalty, Authority and Sanctity. The empirical evidence favoring this grouping comes from patterns of associations between the moral foundations observed with the Moral Foundations Questionnaire.

The liberty foundation
A sixth foundation, liberty (opposite of oppression) was theorized by Jonathan Haidt in The Righteous Mind, chapter eight, in response to economic conservatives complaining that the 5 foundation model didn't caption their notion of fairness correctly, which focused on proportionality, not equality. Meaning you are treated fairly based on what you've earned, not being treated equally unconditionally. This sixth foundation makes it so that fairness/cheating foundation no longer has a split personality; it’s no longer about equality and proportionality. It primarily becomes about proportionality.

Additional candidate foundations
Several other candidate foundations have also been discussed: Efficiency/waste, Ownership/theft, Honesty/deception, and Equity/undeservingness (separate from Fairness).

Methods

Moral Foundations Questionnaire
A large amount of research on Moral Foundations Theory uses self-report instruments such as the Moral Foundations Questionnaire, formally published in 2011 (though earlier versions of the questionnaire had already been published). Subsequent investigations using the Moral Foundations Questionnaire in other cultures have found broadly similar correlations between morality and political identification to those of the US, with studies taking place in Korea, Sweden and New Zealand. However, other studies suggest that the structure of the MFQ is inconsistent across demographic groups (e.g., comparing religious and non-religious and Black and White respondents) and across cultures.

Other Methods
Other materials and methods used to study Moral Foundations Theory include the Moral Foundations Sacredness Scale, Moral Foundations Vignettes, the Socio-Moral Image Database, and Character Moral Foundations Questionnaire. Research on moral language use have also relied on variants of a Moral Foundations Dictionary. Researchers have also examined the topographical maps of somatosensory reactions associated with violations of different moral foundations. Specifically, in a study where participants were asked to describe key aspects of their subjective somatosensory experience in response to scenarios involving various moral violations, body patterns corresponding to violations of moral foundations were felt in different regions of the body depending on whether participants were liberal or conservative.

Applications

Political ideology

Researchers have found that people's sensitivities to the five/six moral foundations correlate with their political ideologies. Using the Moral Foundations Questionnaire, Haidt and Graham found that libertarians are most sensitive to the proposed Liberty foundation, liberals are most sensitive to the Care and Fairness foundations, while conservatives are equally sensitive to all five/six foundations.

According to Haidt, the differences have significant implications for political discourse and relations. Because members of two political camps are to a degree blind to one or more of the moral foundations of the others, they may perceive morally driven words or behavior as having another basisat best self-interested, at worst evil, and thus demonize one another.

Haidt and Graham suggest a compromise can be found to allow liberals and conservatives to see eye-to-eye. They suggest that the five foundations can be used as "doorway" to allow liberals to step to the conservative side of the "wall" put up between these two political affiliations on major political issues (i.e. legalizing gay marriage). If liberals try to consider the latter three foundations in addition to the former two (therefore adopting all five foundations like conservatives for a brief amount of time) they could understand where the conservatives' viewpoints stem from and long-lasting political issues could finally be settled.

Researchers postulate that the moral foundations arose as solutions to problems common in the ancestral hunter-gatherer environment, in particular intertribal and intra-tribal conflict. The three foundations emphasized more by conservatives (Loyalty, Authority, Sanctity) bind groups together for greater strength in intertribal competition while the other two foundations balance those tendencies with concern for individuals within the group. With reduced sensitivity to the group moral foundations, progressives tend to promote a more universalist morality.

The usefulness of moral foundations theory as an explanation for political ideology has been contested on the grounds that moral foundations are less heritable than political ideology, and longitudinal data suggest that political ideology predicts subsequent endorsement of moral foundations, but moral foundations endorsement does not predict subsequent political ideology.

Cross-cultural differences
Haidt's initial field work in Brazil and Philadelphia in 1989, and Odisha, India in 1993, showed that moralizing indeed varies among cultures, but less than by social class (e.g. education) and age. Working-class Brazilian children were more likely to consider both taboo violations and infliction of harm to be morally wrong, and universally so. Members of traditional, collectivist societies, like political conservatives, are more sensitive to violations of the community-related moral foundations. Adult members of so-called WEIRD (western, educated, industrialized, rich, and democratic) societies are the most individualistic, and most likely to draw a distinction between harm-inflicting violations of morality and violations of convention.

Sex differences 
A recent large-scale (u = 336,691) analysis of sex differences based on the five moral foundations suggested that women consistently score higher on care, fairness, and purity across 67 cultures. However, loyalty and authority were shown to have negligible sex differences, highly variable across cultures. This study, published in 2020 in Proceedings of the Royal Society B, also examined country-level sex differences in moral foundations in relation to cultural, socioeconomic, and gender-related indicators revealing that global sex differences in moral foundations are larger in individualistic, Western, and gender-equal cultures. Examining multivariate sex differences in the five moral foundations (i.e. Mahalanobis' D as well as its disattenuated bias-corrected version) in moral judgements, the authors concluded that multivariate effects were substantially larger than previously estimated sex differences in moral judgements using non-MFT frameworks and, more generally, the median effect size in social and personality psychology research. Mahalanobis' D of the five moral foundations were significantly larger in individualist and gender-equal countries.

Critiques and competing theories

A number of researchers have offered critiques of, and alternative theories to, Moral Foundations Theory. Critiques of the theory have included claims of biological implausibility and redundancy among the moral foundations (which are argued to be reducible to concern about harm). Both critiques have been disputed by the original authors. Alternative theories include the Model of Moral Motives, the Theory of Dyadic Morality, Relationship Regulation Theory, the right-wing authoritarianism scale developed by Bob Altemeyer, the theory of Morality As Cooperation, and other impartial approaches to ethical questions, such as justice as fairness by John Rawls and the categorical imperative by Immanuel Kant.

The moral foundations were found to be correlated with the theory of basic human values developed by Schwartz. The strong correlations are between conservatives values in this theory and the binding foundations.

References

External links 
 moralfoundations.org

Psychological theories
Evolutionary psychology
Moral psychology